Carlos L. Valdes (born May 4, 1951) was an American politician in the state of Florida.

Valdes was born in Havana in 1951. He immigrated to the United States with his family in 1960. He received an AA degree from Miami Dade College in 1971 and attended Florida International University from 1972 to 1973. In 1974, he became a licensed real estate and mortgage broker. He served in the Florida House of Representatives for the 112th district from 1988 to 1992 and for the 111th district from 1992 to 2000, as a Republican. He resigned from the House of Representatives on January 25, 2000. In the House of Representatives, he served as Republican Floor Leader from 1992 to 1994 and as Republican Whip from 1994 to 1996.

References

|-

1951 births
Living people
Republican Party members of the Florida House of Representatives
Hispanic and Latino American state legislators in Florida
American politicians of Cuban descent